Hell Patrol can refer to:

A song by British heavy metal band Raven, from the 1981 album Rock Until You Drop
A song by British heavy metal band Judas Priest, from the 1990 album Painkiller